Aljaraque is a city located in the province of Huelva, Spain. According to the 2016 census, the city has a population of 20,745 inhabitants.  In ancient times it was referred to as "Kalathousa" by the Greeks.

Demographics
Aljaraque has received a steady influx of new settlers in the past few years, due to the property price increase in Huelva, and the urban area's quality of life.

Districts 
Aljaraque contains the districts of Corrales, Bellavista, Dehesa Golf, and La Monacilla, most areas of which are urbanized.

Main sights 
 Church of Nuestra Señora de Los Remedios
 Hermitage of Nuestra Señora de Los Remedios
 Church of Nuestra Señora Reina del Mundo
 Church of Nuestra Señora de Bellavista
 Hermitage of San Sebastián
 Archaeological site of Papa Uvas

Gallery

See also
List of municipalities of Spain

References

External links

Aljaraque - Sistema de Información Multiterritorial de Andalucía

Municipalities in the Province of Huelva
Greek colonies in Iberia